Choi Cheol-ho (born 2 March 1970) is a South Korean actor. He rose to fame after appearing in the hit drama Queen of Housewives (also known as My Wife is a Superwoman, 2009). Other notable roles include King Seonjo in The Immortal Lee Soon-shin (2004), Geolsa Biu in Dae Jo Yeong (2006) and King Gyeongjong in Empress Cheonchu (also known as The Iron Empress, 2009).

Personal life
He married Kim Hye-sook on 7 August 2005. Kim was the Chungnam representative at the 2004 Miss Korea pageant. They have one son, Choi Min-joon.

Choi was investigated for drunkenly assaulting an aspiring actress on 8 July 2010, with the incident caught on CCTV.

Filmography

Television series

 River Where the Moon Rises (KBS2, 2021) - ep. #15
 Love Alert (MBN, 2018)
 Dal Soon's Spring (KBS, 2017)
 Saimdang, Memoir of Colors (SBS, 2017)
 The Jingbirok: A Memoir of Imjin War (KBS1, 2015)
 The King's Face (KBS2, 2014)
 Single-minded Dandelion (KBS2, 2014)
 Quiz of God 4 (OCN, 2014) (guest appearance, ep 11-12)
 Gunman in Joseon (KBS2, 2014)
 Into the Flames (TV Chosun, 2014)
 Cunning Single Lady (MBC, 2014)
 Inspiring Generation (KBS2, 2014) 
 The Scandal (MBC, 2013)
 Dream of the Emperor (KBS1, 2012)
 Love Again (jTBC, 2012)
 Hero (OCN, 2012) 
 Dong Yi (MBC, 2010)
 The Woman Who Still Wants to Marry (MBC, 2010)
 The Slave Hunters (KBS2, 2010)
 Hot Blood (KBS2, 2009)
 Partner (KBS2, 2009)
 Queen of Housewives (MBC, 2009)
 Empress Cheonchu (KBS2, 2009)
 KPSI - Season 2 (Super Action, 2008)
 My Pitiful Sister (KBS1, 2008)
 Urban Legends Deja Vu - Season 3 (Super Action, 2008)
 S Clinic (Super Action, 2007)
 Dae Jo-yeong (KBS1, 2006)
 Secret Campus (EBS, 2006)
 지금도 마로니에는 (EBS, 2005)
 Dangerous Love (KBS2, 2005)
 Immortal Admiral Yi Sun-sin (KBS1, 2004)
 Just Like a Beautiful Flying Butterfly (CCTV-3, 2004)
 Jang Gil-san (SBS, 2004)
 Passion (MBC, 2004)
 On the Prairie (KBS2, 2003)
 Rustic Period (SBS, 2002)
 Five Brothers and Sisters (SBS, 2002)
 Sunshine Hunting (KBS2, 2002)
 Father and Sons (SBS, 2001)
 Well Known Woman (SBS, 2001)
 Golden Era (MBC, 2000)
 Love in 3 Colors (KBS2, 1999)
 Promise (SBS, 1999)
 Advocate (MBC, 1998)

Film
My Little Baby, Jaya (2017)
Confession (2015)
The Most Beautiful Picnic in The World (unreleased, filmed in 2010)
My Pitiful Sister (2008)
Solace (2006)
Who's Got the Tape (2004)
Summertime (2001)
General Hospital the Movie: A Thousand Days (2000)
The Butcher's Wife (1999)
Calla (1999)
Tie a Yellow Ribbon (1998)
The Quiet Family (1998)
The Contact (1997)

Awards
2009 KBS Drama Awards: Best Supporting Actor (Empress Cheonchu, Hot Blood, Partner)
2009 MBC Drama Awards: Excellence Award, Actor (Queen of Housewives)

References

External links

1970 births
Living people
South Korean male film actors
South Korean male television actors
Male actors from Seoul
20th-century South Korean male actors
21st-century South Korean male actors